The rostral interstitial nucleus of medial longitudinal fasciculus (riMLF) is a portion of the medial longitudinal fasciculus which controls vertical gaze.

They project to the vestibular nuclei.

External links
 https://uni-tuebingen.de/uni/knl/Vilis/originof.htm
 http://anatomy.umc.edu/faculty/lynch.html
 https://web.archive.org/web/20091021004541/http://isc.temple.edu/neuroanatomy/lab/atlas/papc/

Brainstem